Loxostegopsis is a genus of moths of the family Crambidae.

Species
Loxostegopsis curialis Barnes & McDunnough, 1918
Loxostegopsis emigralis (Barnes & McDunnough, 1918)
Loxostegopsis merrickalis (Barnes & McDunnough, 1918)
Loxostegopsis polle Dyar, 1917
Loxostegopsis xanthocepsalis (Hampson, 1918)
Loxostegopsis xanthocrypta

References

Spilomelinae
Crambidae genera
Taxa named by Harrison Gray Dyar Jr.